Orthoretrovirinae is a subfamily of viruses belonging to Retroviridae, a family of enveloped viruses that replicate in a host cell through the process of reverse transcription. The subfamily currently includes six genera, of which Lentivirus contains the human immunodeficiency virus (HIV). These viruses cause a variety of tumors, malignancies and immune deficiency disease in humans, other mammals and birds.  A few, like Simian immunodeficiency virus (SIV), apparently cause no disease in their natural hosts.

References

Retroviridae
Virus subfamilies